The 2004 United States presidential election in Oklahoma took place on November 2, 2004, and was part of the 2004 United States presidential election. Voters chose seven representatives, or electors to the Electoral College, who voted for president and vice president.

Oklahoma was won by incumbent President George W. Bush by a 31.14% margin of victory. Prior to the election, all 12 news organizations considered this a state Bush would win, or otherwise considered a safe red state. Bush won this state, every single county, and congressional district. Giving Bush 65.57% of the vote, it was the most Republican state in the south and Bush's fifth best performance in the country after Utah, Wyoming, Idaho and Nebraska.

Oklahoma has been a Republican-leaning state since 1952 and a Republican stronghold since 1980. This was the first of five consecutive elections to date in which every county in the state was won by the Republican candidate.

Primaries
 2004 Oklahoma Democratic presidential primary
 2004 Oklahoma Republican presidential primary

Campaign

Predictions
There were 12 news organizations who made state-by-state predictions of the election. Here are their last predictions before election day.

 D.C. Political Report: Solid Republican
 Associated Press: Solid Bush
 CNN: Bush
Cook Political Report: Solid Republican
 Newsweek: Solid Bush
New York Times: Solid Bush
 Rasmussen Reports: Bush
 Research 2000: Solid Bush
Washington Post: Bush
Washington Times: Solid Bush
Zogby International: Bush
 Washington Dispatch: Bush

Polling
Bush won every single pre-election poll, each with a double-digit margin and with at least 53% of the vote, except for the first poll. Many polls had Bush winning with a 30% margin or even higher. The final 3 poll average had Bush leading 63% to 32%.

Fundraising
Bush raised $1,194,549. Kerry raised $357,038.

Advertising and visits
Neither campaign advertised or visited this state during the fall campaign.

Analysis
By 2000, Oklahoma had long been one of the more Republican-leaning states in the South, having been one of only two Southern states to have voted for Gerald Ford over Jimmy Carter in 1976, and having been one of a handful of Southern states never to vote for Bill Clinton. In 2000, George W. Bush, then the governor of the neighboring state of Texas, carried the Sooner State with a little over 60% of the vote, making it his sixth-best state nationally and his best state in the South that year. However, Al Gore did manage to carry a cluster of traditionally Democratic rural counties in the eastern part of the state.

In 2004, Bush improved his percentage in Oklahoma by a little over 5% and carried every county in the state, the first of five consecutive elections (as of 2020) in which the Republican has swept the state's counties. He performed strongly in both the state's rural areas, and in its two main population centers, getting 64% of the vote in both Oklahoma and Tulsa Counties. Only in six counties was Kerry so much as able to hold Bush to a single-digit margin: Cherokee, Choctaw, Coal, McIntosh, Muskogee, and Okmulgee. None of these cast over 30,000 votes. However, in McIntosh County, John Kerry held Bush to a margin of just 2%, which would be the closest any Democrat since Gore came to carrying any Oklahoma county until Joe Biden came within 1.5% of carrying Oklahoma County in 2020. In addition, McIntosh County voted marginally more Democratic than the nation at-large, the last time any county in the state has voted as such as of 2022.

The third-party vote, which had amounted to 1.26% of the total state vote in 2000, disappeared in 2004, as no independent obtained ballot access in the state in 2004. Oklahoma has the toughest laws regarding third-party ballot access, and 2004 was the first of three elections in a row in which only the Democrat and the Republican appeared on the ballot (with write-in votes not allowed).

Results

By county

Counties that flipped from Democratic to Republican
Cherokee (Largest city: Tahlequah)
Choctaw (Largest city: Hugo)
Haskell (Largest city: Stigler)
Hughes (Largest city: Holdenville)
Latimer (Largest city: Wilburton)
McIntosh (Largest city: Checotah)
Muskogee (Largest city: Muskogee)
Okmulgee (Largest city: Okmulgee)
Ottawa (Largest city: Miami)

By congressional district
Bush won all 5 congressional districts, including one held by a Democrat.

Electors

Technically the voters of Oklahoma cast their ballots for electors: representatives to the Electoral College. Oklahoma is allocated 7 electors because it has 5 congressional districts and 2 senators. All candidates who appear on the ballot or qualify to receive write-in votes must submit a list of 7 electors, who pledge to vote for their candidate and his or her running mate. Whoever wins the majority of votes in the state is awarded all 7 electoral votes. Their chosen electors then vote for president and vice president. Although electors are pledged to their candidate and running mate, they are not obligated to vote for them. An elector who votes for someone other than his or her candidate is known as a faithless elector.

The electors of each state and the District of Columbia met on December 13, 2004, to cast their votes for president and vice president. The Electoral College itself never meets as one body. Instead the electors from each state and the District of Columbia met in their respective capitols.

The following were the members of the Electoral College from the state. All 7 were pledged for Bush/Cheney:
 George Wiland
 Paul Hollrah
 Colby Schwartz
 Diana Gunther
 Ken Bartlett
 Donald Burdick
 Bob Hudspeth

The slate for the Democrats, which was not elected, consisted of George Krumme, Edwynne Krumme, Maxine Horner, Jim Hamilton, Bernice Mitchell, Betty McElderry, and Bob Lemon.

See also
 United States presidential elections in Oklahoma
 Presidency of George W. Bush

References

Oklahoma
2004
United States presidential